Faust is the protagonist of a German tale who makes a pact with the Devil. The character is based on a real person, Johann Georg Faust. The tale is the basis of many works. 

Faust may also refer to:

Arts and entertainment

Film and television
 Faust (1926 film), directed by Friedrich Wilhelm Murnau
 Faust (1960 film), directed by Peter Gorski
 Faust (1994 film), directed by Jan Švankmajer
 Faust: Love of the Damned (film) (2000), directed by Brian Yuzna
 Dark Faust, a character in Ultraman Nexus (2004–2005 Japanese TV series)
 Faust, a character in Beyblade: Metal Masters (2010–2011 anime series)
 Faust (2011 film), directed by Alexander Sokurov
 Ilsa Faust, a character in Mission: Impossible – Rogue Nation (2015 film)
 Johnny Faust, a character in American Satan (2017 film) and Paradise City (2021–present TV series)
 The Last Faust (2019 film), directed by Philipp Humm

Gaming
 Faust, a character in Vendetta (1991 video game)
 Faust (Guilty Gear), a character in Guilty Gear (1998–present video game series)
 Faust (video game) (1999 graphic adventure game)
 Faust, a character in Jazz and Faust (2002 graphic adventure game)

Literature
 Goethe's Faust (Part I, 1806; Part II, 1831), a work by Johann Wolfgang von Goethe
 Faust (1855), a novella by Ivan Turgenev
 Faust (1866), a satirical poem by Estanislao del Campo
 Faust (manga) (1950), a manga by Osamu Tezuka
 Felix Faust, a character in DC Comics continuity (introduced 1962)
 Faust (1980), a novel by Robert Nye
 Faust (comics) (1987–2012), a series of comic books by David Quinn & Tim Vigil
 Sebastian Faust, a character in DC Comics continuity (introduced 1993)
 Faust VIII, a character in Shaman King (1994–2004, 2021–present manga and anime series)
 Faust (magazine) (2003–present), a Japanese literary anthology
 Frau Faust (2014–2017), a manga by Kore Yamazaki

Music
 Faust Overture ( 1840), a concert overture by Richard Wagner
 La damnation de Faust (1846), a work for orchestra and chorus by Hector Berlioz
 Faust Symphony (1857), a symphony by Franz Liszt
 Faust (band) (1971–present), a German krautrock band
 Faust (album) (1971), an album by the band Faust
 "Faust" (2001), a song by Gorillaz from G Sides
 "Faust Arp" (2007), a song by Radiohead from In Rainbows

Theatre and opera
 Faust ballets (18th–20th centuries), a set of ballets
 Faust (Spohr) (1816), an opera by Louis Spohr
 Faust (opera) (1859, revised 1869), an opera by Charles Gounod
 Doktor Faust (1925), an opera by Ferruccio Busoni
 Randy Newman's Faust (1995), a musical by Randy Newman
 Der Faust (2006–present), an annual German theatre prize
 Faust (2012), a play by Edgar Brau
 Faust (EWTC show) (2016), a play by the East West Theatre Company

Other media
 Faust (paintings) (1976–1979), a series by Nabil Kanso

People

In academia
 Albert Bernhardt Faust (1870–1951), scholar of German-American studies
 Beatrice Faust (born 1939), Australian author and women's activist
 David Faust (born 1955), author and president of Cincinnati Christian University
 Drew Gilpin Faust (born 1947), historian and president of Harvard University
 Johann Georg Faust (1480–1541), itinerant alchemist, astrologer and magician of the German Renaissance
 Faust Shkaravsky (1897–1975), army physician and forensic expert

In arts
 Alban Faust (born 1960), luthier and player of traditional Swedish music
 Berthold Faust (born 1935), German nature artist
 Chad Faust (born 1980), Canadian actor, singer, film producer, film director, and screenwriter
 Chris Faust (born 1955), American landscape photographer
 Christa Faust (born 1969), American author
 Faust (musician) (born 1974), Norwegian metal drummer
 Faust Lang (1887–1973), German sculptor
 Frederick Schiller Faust (1892–1944), American author better known as Max Brand
 Georg Faust (born 1956), German cellist
 Isabelle Faust (born 1972), German violinist
 Joe Clifford Faust (born 1957), American author
 Lauren Faust (born 1974), American animator who created My Little Pony: Friendship Is Magic
 Lucy Faust (born 1986), American actress
 Nancy Faust (born 1947), American organist

Sportspeople
 Andre Faust (born 1969), Canadian ice hockey player
 Charlie Faust (1880–1915), American baseball pitcher
 Christopher Faust (born 1968), German hockey coach and trainer
 George Faust (1917–1993), American football player
 Gerry Faust (born 1935), American football player and coach
 Joe Faust (athlete) (born 1942), American high jumper

Other people
 Alfred Faust (1883–1961), German advertising executive, journalist and politician
 Charles L. Faust (1879–1928), American politician from Missouri
 Jack Faust (attorney) (born 1932), American attorney and television broadcaster
 James E. Faust (1920–2007), American leader of The Church of Jesus Christ of Latter-day Saints
 Jean Satterthwaite Faust (born 1930), American women's rights activist
 William Faust (1929–1995), American politician from Michigan

Places

 Faust, Alberta, a hamlet in Canada
 Faust, Missouri, a ghost town
 Faust, North Carolina, an unincorporated community
 Faust, Utah, an unincorporated community

Other
 FAUST (programming language), a purely functional language for signal processing
 , a cargo carrier in service 2007–present
 , a coaster in service 1920–1926

See also 
 Works based on Faust
 Deals with the Devil in popular culture
 Fausto (disambiguation)
 Faustus (disambiguation)
 Foust, a surname (including a list of people with the name)